The Princess Bride is a 1987 American fantasy adventure comedy film directed and co-produced by Rob Reiner and starring Cary Elwes, Robin Wright, Mandy Patinkin, Chris Sarandon, Wallace Shawn, André the Giant, and Christopher Guest. Adapted by William Goldman from his 1973 novel of the same name, it tells the story of a swashbuckling farmhand named Westley, accompanied by companions befriended along the way, who must rescue his true love Princess Buttercup from the odious Prince Humperdinck. The film preserves the novel's metafictional narrative style by presenting the story as a book being read by a grandfather to his sick grandson.

The film was first released in the United States on September 25, 1987, and was well received by critics at the time. After only having modest success at the box office at first, it has over time become a cult film and been considered as one of the best films of the 1980s, and one of Reiner's best works. The film is number 50 on the Bravo's "100 Funniest Movies", number 88 on The American Film Institute's (AFI) "AFI's 100 Years...100 Passions" list of the 100 greatest film love stories, and 46 in Channel 4's 50 Greatest Comedy Films list. The film also won the 1988 Hugo Award for Best Dramatic Presentation.

In 2016, the film was selected by the Library of Congress for preservation in the United States National Film Registry as being "culturally, historically or aesthetically significant".

Plot

A grandfather reads a novel to his sick grandson, who initially dismisses the story.

The tale is about Buttercup, a young woman living on a farm in the fictional kingdom of Florin. Whenever she tells farmhand Westley to do something, he always complies, saying, "As you wish", (which is his way of saying that he loves her). The two fall in love, and Westley leaves to seek his fortune overseas so they can marry. When his ship is attacked by the Dread Pirate Roberts, Westley is presumed dead.

Five years later, Buttercup is forcibly betrothed to Florin's Prince Humperdinck. Before the wedding, she is kidnapped by three outlaws: a small Sicilian man named Vizzini, a giant from Greenland named Fezzik, and a Spanish fencing master named Inigo Montoya, who seeks revenge against a six-fingered man who murdered his father. A masked man in black pursues them, as does Prince Humperdinck and his soldiers.

The man in black confronts the outlaws atop the Cliffs of Insanity. He defeats Inigo in a fencing duel and knocks him out, chokes Fezzik into unconsciousness, and tricks Vizzini into drinking a deadly poison. He forcibly flees with Buttercup. Buttercup correctly guesses he is the Dread Pirate Roberts, berates him for killing Westley, and shoves him into a gorge. While tumbling down, he shouts, "As you wish!" Realizing it is Westley, she throws herself into the gorge after him, and they are reunited.

As they make their way through the dangerous Fire Swamp to avoid Humperdinck and his men, Westley explains how "Dread Pirate Roberts" is an inherited title that he assumed when the previous Roberts wished to retire. Having found Buttercup, Westley intends to surrender the title to another. Humperdinck captures the pair after they emerge from the Fire Swamp. Buttercup agrees to return with Humperdinck after he promises to release Westley. Humperdinck secretly orders his sadistic vizier, Count Rugen, to take Westley to his torture chamber, the Pit of Despair. Before being knocked out, Westley notices that Rugen has six fingers on his right hand.

When Buttercup threatens suicide if the wedding happens, Humperdinck falsely promises to find Westley for her. His real plan is to start a war with the neighboring country of Guilder by killing Buttercup and framing Guilder for the murder. He had secretly hired Vizzini to do this before Westley interfered. Meanwhile, Fezzik becomes part of the brute squad ordered to clear the thieves' forest before the wedding. He finds a drunk Inigo living in the forest, whom he sobers up and tells him about Rugen. Inigo realizes that he and Fezzik need Westley's help to storm the castle.

Buttercup finds out that Humperdinck never intended to search for Westley and calls him a coward. Enraged, Humperdinck imprisons Buttercup and tortures Westley, seemingly to death. Inigo and Fezzik, who followed Westley's screams through the forest, find his body and bring him to Miracle Max, a folk healer. Max is able to revive the "mostly dead" Westley, though he is severely weakened.

As Westley, Inigo, and Fezzik storm the castle, Humperdinck panics and orders the in-progress wedding ceremony to be shortened. Inigo finds and chases Rugen before Rugen throws a knife into Inigo's abdomen. Rugen realizes who Inigo is and taunts him about his father's death. Inigo overcomes the pain and kills Rugen. Westley locates Buttercup, who believes she is married to Humperdinck and is about to commit suicide. Westley assures her the marriage is invalid because she never completed her wedding vows. Humperdinck finds them, and challenges Westley to a duel, but Westley wills himself to stand and intimidates the prince into surrendering just before Inigo finds them. They hear Fezzik's voice outside and discover he has procured four white horses for their escape. They leave Humperdinck tied to a chair and jump to safety through the window. Having killed Rugen, Inigo is unsure what to do with his life now. Westley offers him the Dread Pirate Roberts's title. As dawn arises, Westley and Buttercup share a passionate kiss.

Back in his bedroom, the boy eagerly asks his grandfather to read him the story again the next day, to which his grandfather replies, "As you wish.”

Cast

Framing story
 Fred Savage as The Grandson
 Peter Falk as Grandpa/The Narrator
 Betsy Brantley as The Mother

Main story
 Cary Elwes as Westley/Dread Pirate Roberts/The Man in Black
 Robin Wright as Buttercup/The Princess Bride
 Mandy Patinkin as Inigo Montoya
 Chris Sarandon as Prince Humperdinck
 Christopher Guest as Count Tyrone Rugen
 Wallace Shawn as Vizzini
 André the Giant as Fezzik
 Peter Cook as The Impressive Clergyman
 Mel Smith as The Albino
 Carol Kane as Valerie, Max's wife
 Billy Crystal as Miracle Max
 Margery Mason as The Ancient Booer
 Malcolm Storry as Yellin
 Willoughby Gray as The King

Production

Development
Rob Reiner, who had been enamored with Goldman's book ever since he was given it as a gift from his father, Carl Reiner, realized he wanted to make the film adaptation after successfully demonstrating his filmmaking skill with the release of This Is Spinal Tap in 1984. During production of Stand by Me, released in 1986, Reiner had spoken to an executive at Paramount Pictures regarding what his next film would be, and suggested the adaptation of The Princess Bride. He was told they could not, leading Reiner to discover that several studios had previously attempted to bring Goldman's book to the big screen without success.

Those previous attempts included 20th Century Fox, which paid Goldman $500,000 for the film rights and to do a screenplay in 1973. Richard Lester was signed to direct and the movie was almost made, but the head of production at Fox was fired and the project was put on hiatus. Goldman subsequently bought back the film rights to the novel with his own money. Other directors had also attempted to adapt the book, including François Truffaut, Robert Redford and Norman Jewison, and at one point, Christopher Reeve was interested in playing Westley in one planned adaption. Reiner found success by gaining financial support from Norman Lear, whom Reiner knew from All in the Family and who had funded production of This is Spinal Tap, with the production to be distributed by 20th Century Fox. Reiner worked closely with Goldman to adapt the book for the screenplay.

Casting
Reiner had quickly decided on Cary Elwes for Westley, based on his performance in Lady Jane; however, during the casting period in Los Angeles, Elwes was in Germany on set for Maschenka. Reiner flew out to Berlin to meet with Elwes, confirming his appropriateness for the role. While Reiner and casting director Jane Jenkins auditioned other actors for Westley, they knew Elwes was perfect for the part. Elwes had read the book in his childhood and associated himself with the character of Westley, but never believed he would have the opportunity to play him.

Robin Wright was cast late in the process, about a week before filming; Reiner and Jenkins had auditioned a number of English actresses but had not found their ideal Buttercup. Uma Thurman, Meg Ryan, Sean Young, Suzy Amis, Courteney Cox, Alexandra Paul and Whoopi Goldberg auditioned for the role of Buttercup. Wright's agent had heard of the casting call and encouraged Wright to audition. Though initially shy, Wright impressed Jenkins, and later Reiner. They invited Wright to come meet Goldman at his house. Jenkins recalls: "The doorbell rang. Rob went to the door, and literally, as he opened the door, [Wright] was standing there in this little white summer dress, with her long blonde hair, and she had a halo from the sun. She was backlit by God. And Bill Goldman looked across the room at her, and he said, 'Well, that's what I wrote.' It was the most perfect thing."

Mandy Patinkin and Wallace Shawn were early choices for the cast; Shawn in particular was chosen as Vizzini due to his diminutive size to contrast that of the giant Fezzik. Danny DeVito was considered for the role of Vizzini.

When Goldman originally shopped his novel in the early 1970s, his first choice for Fezzik was André the Giant, whose wrestling schedule left him unavailable for filming. Goldman's second choice was Arnold Schwarzenegger, who at that time was almost unknown as an actor. However, by the time The Princess Bride was finally green-lit, Schwarzenegger was a major film star and the studio could not afford him. Jenkins contacted the World Wrestling Federation to ask about hiring André, but were told that the filming conflicted with a wrestling match in Tokyo that would pay him $5 million. Jenkins auditioned other tall men, including Kareem Abdul-Jabbar, Lou Ferrigno and Carel Struycken, but these did not pan out. Liam Neeson also auditioned for the role, but he was turned down due to height. Near the end of casting, the World Wrestling Federation told Jenkins that André's match in Tokyo had been cancelled, clearing him to play the role of Fezzik. For his part, André found his participation was a gratifying experience considering that no one stared at him on set during production as a kind of freak, but instead simply treated him as a fellow member of the cast.

Filming

The film was shot in various locations in England and Ireland in late 1986:
 Carl Wark, Sheffield, England
 Burnham Beeches, Buckinghamshire, England
 Lathkill Dale where it meets Cales Dale (the "Battle of wits" scene)
 Cave Dale, Castleton, Derbyshire, England
 Bradley Rocks and Robin Hood's Stride, Birchover, Derbyshire, England
 Cliffs of Moher, County Clare, Ireland (for the Cliffs of Insanity)
 Haddon Hall, Bakewell, Derbyshire, England
 Penshurst Place, Kent, England

The framing story scenes, the last to be filmed, were shot at Shepperton Studios in Surrey.

Reiner rented a house in England near these sites and frequently invited the cast over for meals and light-hearted get-togethers. Many cast members believed this helped to create a sense of "family" that helped to improve their performances for the film.

Cary Elwes and Mandy Patinkin learned to fence (both left- and right-handed) for the film, and performed these scenes themselves, outside of the two somersaults, which were performed by stunt doubles. They were trained by fencing instructors Bob Anderson and stunt arranger Peter Diamond, both of whom had also worked on training the actors in the original Star Wars trilogy. Elwes and Patinkin spent about three weeks prior to filming learning to fence, and spent most of their off-camera free time practicing. Anderson encouraged the two to learn the other's choreography for the fight to help them anticipate the movements and avoid an accident. They also watched many sword fights from previous films to see how they could improve on those.

André the Giant had undergone major back surgery prior to filming and, despite his great size and strength, could not support the weight of Elwes during their fight scene or Wright for a scene at the end of the film. For the wrestling scene, when Elwes hangs on André's back, he was actually walking on a series of ramps below the camera during close-ups. For the wide shots, a stunt double took the place of André. When he was apparently carrying Wright, she was actually suspended by cables.

Billy Crystal and Carol Kane spent time before traveling to England to work out the backstory between Miracle Max and his wife, and develop a rapport for their characters. Once on set, Reiner allowed them to improvise some of their lines.

Soundtrack

The original soundtrack album was composed by Mark Knopfler of Dire Straits, and released by Warner Bros. Records in the United States and Vertigo Records internationally in November 1987. The album contains the song "Storybook Love", performed by Willy DeVille and produced by Mark Knopfler. It was nominated for an Academy Award for Best Original Song at the 60th Academy Awards.

In his audio commentary of the film on the special edition DVD, director Rob Reiner said that only Knopfler could create a soundtrack to capture the film's quirky yet romantic nature. Reiner was an admirer of Knopfler's work but did not know him before working on the film. He sent the script to him hoping he would agree to score the film. Knopfler agreed on one condition: that somewhere in the film Reiner would include the  baseball cap (which had been modified to say "USS Ooral Sea OV-4B") he wore as Marty DiBergi in This Is Spinal Tap. Reiner was unable to produce the original cap, but did include a similar cap in the grandson's room. Knopfler later said he was joking.

Reception
The film premiered at the Ryerson Theatre in Toronto as part of the 1987 Toronto International Film Festival. It went into wide-release later that fall in North America.

Box office
The film was initially a modest success, grossing $30.8 million at the United States and Canada box office, on a $16 million production budget.

Critical response
On Rotten Tomatoes, the film holds a 97% approval rating based on 79 reviews and an average rating of 8.50/10. The site's consensus states, "A delightfully postmodern fairy tale, The Princess Bride is a deft, intelligent mix of swashbuckling, romance, and comedy that takes an age-old damsel-in-distress story and makes it fresh." On Metacritic, the film holds a score of 77 out of 100, based on 20 critics, indicating "generally favorable reviews." Audiences surveyed by CinemaScore gave the film a grade "A+" on scale of A to F.

Gene Siskel and Roger Ebert gave the film a "two thumbs up" rating on their television program. Ebert also wrote a very favorable print review in his column for the Chicago Sun-Times. Richard Corliss of Time said the film was fun for the whole family, and later, Time listed the film as one of the "Best of '87". Janet Maslin of The New York Times praised the cast and the sweetness of the film.

Legacy
The Princess Bride was not a major box-office success, but it became a cult classic after its release to the home video market. The film is widely regarded as eminently quotable. Elwes noted in 2017, on the film's 30th anniversary, that fans still frequently come up to him and quote lines from the movie. According to him, Wallace Shawn had it "worse" because any time Wallace made a small error, like dropping his keys, people would shout "Inconceivable!" at him.

In 2000, readers of Total Film magazine voted The Princess Bride the 38th greatest comedy film of all time. In 2005 The Princess Bride was voted 40th in Channel 4's 100 Greatest Family Films poll ahead of Snow White and the Seven Dwarfs and Beetlejuice and just behind Bugsy Malone and Bedknobs & Broomsticks In 2006, William Goldman's screenplay was selected by the Writers Guild of America as the 84th best screenplay of all time; it earned the same ranking in the Guild's 2013 update. The film was selected number 88 on The American Film Institute's (AFI) "AFI's 100 Years... 100 Passions" listing the 100 greatest film love stories of all time. BBC Radio 5's resident film critic, Mark Kermode, is a fan of the film, frequently considering it a model to which similar films aspire.

American Film Institute lists
 AFI's 100 Years...100 Laughs – Nominated
 AFI's 100 Years...100 Passions – No. 88
 AFI's 100 Years...100 Movie Quotes:
 "Hello. My name is Inigo Montoya. You killed my father; prepare to die!" – Nominated
 AFI's 10 Top 10 – Nominated Fantasy Film

In December 2011, director Jason Reitman staged a live dramatic reading of The Princess Bride script at the Los Angeles County Museum of Art (LACMA), with Paul Rudd as Westley; Mindy Kaling as Buttercup; Patton Oswalt as Vizzini; Kevin Pollak as Miracle Max; Goran Visnjic as Inigo Montoya; Cary Elwes (switching roles) as Humperdinck; director Rob Reiner as the grandfather; and Fred Savage reprising his role as the grandson.

In 2013, director Ari Folman released a live-action animated film titled The Congress, which directly referenced The Princess Bride. Folman's film starred Robin Wright, playing both a live and animated version of herself, as a digitally cloned actress.

In 2014, Cary Elwes wrote As You Wish: Inconceivable Tales from the Making of The Princess Bride, a behind-the-scenes account of the film's production, co-written with Joe Layden. To help Elwes recall the production, Lear sent him a bound copy of the filming's call sheets. The book debuted at No. 3 on the New York Times Bestseller list. In addition to a foreword by director Rob Reiner and a limited edition poster, the book includes exclusive photos and interviews with the cast members from the 25th anniversary cast reunion, as well as unique stories and set secrets from the making of the film.

In 2018, Savage reprised his role as The Grandson in a PG-13 version of Deadpool 2 entitled Once Upon a Deadpool, with Deadpool taking the role of The Narrator and reading Deadpool 2's story to him at bedtime and skipping over the more adult parts from the R-rated version.

In 2020, a bar themed after the film, named "As You Wish", opened in Chicago. The menu features 16 themed cocktails.

Post-theatrical release

In North America, the film was released on VHS and LaserDisc in 1988 by Nelson Entertainment, the latter being a "bare bones" release in unmatted full screen. New Line Home Video reissued the VHS in 1994. The film was also released on Video CD by Philips.

The Criterion Collection released a matted widescreen version, bare bones version on laserdisc in 1989, supplementing it with liner notes. In 1997 Criterion re-released the Laserdisc as a "special edition". This edition was widescreen and included an audio commentary by Rob Reiner, William Goldman, Andrew Scheinman, Billy Crystal and Peter Falk (this commentary would also later appear on the Criterion Blu-ray and DVD release); excerpts from the novel read by Rob Reiner; behind the scenes footage; a production scrapbook by unit photographer Clive Coote; design sketches by production designer Norman Garwood; and excerpts from the television series Morton and Hayes, directed by Christopher Guest.

By 2000, MGM had acquired the US home video rights to the film (as part of the "pre-1996 PolyGram Filmed Entertainment film library" package) and released the film on VHS and DVD. The DVD release featured the soundtrack remastered in Dolby Digital 5.1 with the film in wide and full screen versions, and included the original US theatrical trailer. The next year MGM re-released the film in another widescreen "special edition", this time with two audio commentaries—one by Rob Reiner, the other by William Goldman—"As You Wish", "Promotional", and "Making Of" featurettes; a "Cary Elwes Video Diary"; the US and UK theatrical trailers; four television spots; a photo gallery; and a collectible booklet.

In 2006, MGM and Sony Pictures Home Entertainment released a two-disc set with varying covers—the "Dread Pirate" and "Buttercup" editions. Each featured their respective character, but had identical features: in addition to the features in the previous release were, the "Dread Pirate Roberts: Greatest Legend of the Seven Seas", "Love is Like a Storybook Story", and "Miraculous Make Up" featurettes, "The Quotable Battle of Wits" game, and Fezzik's "Guide to Florin" booklet.

A year later, to commemorate the 20th anniversary of the film, MGM and 20th Century Fox Home Entertainment released the film with flippable cover art featuring the title displayed in an ambigram. This DVD did not include any bonus features from the older editions, but had new short featurettes and a new game. A Blu-ray Disc was released on March 17, 2009, encoded in 5.1 DTS-HD Master Audio. Special features included two audio commentaries, the original theatrical trailer and eight featurettes.

In 2007, the film was released for download in the iTunes Store.

The film is available in Europe (DVD Region 2), published by Lions Gate Entertainment. Its extras are the theatrical trailer and text filmographies.

The Criterion Collection released the film on Blu-ray and DVD on October 30, 2018. It included a new 4K digital transfer, the same audio commentary from the Criterion LaserDisc release, an edited 1987 audiobook reading of Goldman's novel by director Rob Reiner, new programs on William Goldman's screenplay and tapestry, a new interview with art director Richard Holland, an essay by author Sloane Crosley, and a Blu-ray exclusive book highlighting four screenplays, as well as Goldman's introduction to the 1995 screenplay.

The Princess Bride has been made available on May 1, 2020, on The Walt Disney Company's streaming service Disney+.

Adaptations
It was announced that composer Adam Guettel was working with William Goldman on a musical adaptation of The Princess Bride in 2006. The project was abandoned in February 2007 after Goldman reportedly demanded 75 percent of the author's share, even though Guettel was writing both the music and the lyrics.

In late 2013, Disney Theatrical Productions announced that they would adapt a stage musical adaptation of The Princess Bride. A website was launched a couple of months later. In 2016, Rob Reiner said the project was still in development despite "roadblocks" and that Marc Shaiman, Randy Newman and John Mayer had all been approached to write songs, but had turned them down.

In 2018, The Princess Bride was adapted by players of a virtual reality social game, Rec Room, into what is likely to be the world's first full-length virtual reality stage production. The duration of the production was approximately 80 minutes, and ran for a total of four shows.

There have been many board games based on the film, beginning with a promotional roll and move game distributed with an early VHS video release in 1988. In 2008, PlayRoom Entertainment released The Princess Bride: Storming the Castle, a board game based on the film. Since 2013, Game Salute (now Tabletop Tycoon, under the SparkWorks imprint) has published multiple games based on specific scenes from the film, including party game The Princess Bride: Prepare to Die!, card game The Princess Bride: A Battle of Wits and dice game The Princess Bride: I Hate to Kill You... In 2020, Ravensburger published The Princess Bride Adventure Book Game, a collaborative card and miniatures game with several boards presented as "chapters" of a book.

The Princess Bride Game is a casual video game developed and published by New York game development studio Worldwide Biggies.

In June 2020, a "fan made" recreation of The Princess Bride was released on Quibi called Home Movie: The Princess Bride. It was produced by Jason Reitman during the COVID-19 pandemic quarantine in March 2020 with help from an ensemble cast who filmed themselves recreating the various scenes at their homes to raise money for the World Central Kitchen charity. Reitman received backing from Jeffrey Katzenberg for the project, as well as the rights to stream the film on his Quibi service. The "fan-made" film also had approval from Norman Lear and the estate of William Goldman, and Mark Knopfler permitted the use of his music. Rob Reiner approved of the project, even briefly stepping in to play the grandfather. It also features the final performance of Carl Reiner, playing the grandfather in the last scene to his own son. The film was dedicated to his memory as he died days later.

On September 13, 2020, most of the original cast members took part in a virtual live read-through of The Princess Bride script, Princess Bride Reunion, to support the Democratic Party of Wisconsin. The returning cast included Elwes, Wright, Sarandon, Patinkin, Guest, Shawn, Crystal, and Kane, with additional performances by Rob Reiner as the Grandfather, Josh Gad as Fezzik, Eric Idle as the Impressive Clergyman, Whoopi Goldberg as the Ancient Booer and the Mother, King Bach as Yellin, the Assistant Brute and the King, Finn Wolfhard as the Grandson, Shaun Ross as The Man With Albinism, and Jason Reitman as the narrator. Norman Lear joined the Q&A session at the end, which was hosted by Patton Oswalt. Cast members promoted the event beforehand using the hashtags "#PrincessBrideReunion and "#DumpTrumperdinck".  More than 110,000 viewers donated a dollar or more to Wisconsin Democrats to view the livestream event.

Potential remake
In a September 2019 biographical article on Norman Lear in Variety, Sony Pictures Entertainment CEO Tony Vinciquerra, speaking of Lear's works and interest in remaking them, stated, "Very famous people whose names I won't use, but they want to redo The Princess Bride." The reaction to this via social media was very negative, with fans of the film asserting that a remake would be a bad idea and, in reference to the film, "inconceivable". Elwes paraphrased the film, saying, "There's a shortage of perfect movies in this world. It would be a pity to damage this one." Jamie Lee Curtis, Guest's wife, stated, "there is only ONE The Princess Bride and it's William Goldman and [Reiner]'s".

Books

References

Further reading 
 Goldman, William, Which Lie Did They Tell?, Bloomsbury, 2000

External links

 
 
 
 
 
 
 The Princess Bride: Let Me Sum Up an essay by Sloane Crosley at the Criterion Collection

 
1980s action comedy films
1980s adventure comedy films
1980s fantasy comedy films
1987 romantic comedy films
1980s satirical films
1987 films
1980s fantasy adventure films
1987 soundtrack albums
American action adventure films
American children's adventure films
American adventure comedy films
American fantasy adventure films
American fantasy comedy films
American romantic fantasy films
American satirical films
American swashbuckler films
Films about royalty
American films about revenge
Films about weddings
Films based on adventure novels
Films based on American novels
Films based on fantasy novels
Films based on romance novels
Films based on works by William Goldman
Films directed by Rob Reiner
Films set in a fictional country
Films set in castles
Films about giants
20th Century Fox films
Vestron Pictures films
Hugo Award for Best Dramatic Presentation winning works
Toronto International Film Festival People's Choice Award winners
Pirate films
Films with screenplays by William Goldman
United States National Film Registry films
Self-reflexive films
Frame stories
1980s English-language films
1980s American films
Postmodern films